The she-oak skink (Cyclodomorphus casuarinae) is a large, long-tailed, snake-like skink endemic to Tasmania, Australia.  It is viviparous; mating in spring, and giving birth in latest summer.

References

Reptiles of Tasmania
Skinks of Australia
Cyclodomorphus
Reptiles described in 1839
Taxa named by André Marie Constant Duméril
Taxa named by Gabriel Bibron